Jeferey "Jeff" Muralt is a paralympic athlete from New Zealand competing mainly in category T53 track events.

Muralt competed in the 1996 Summer Paralympics in Atlanta in the 400m, 800m, 1500m and 5000m. His only medal was in the 400m where he finished third.

References

External links 
 
 

Paralympic athletes of New Zealand
Athletes (track and field) at the 1996 Summer Paralympics
Paralympic bronze medalists for New Zealand
Living people
Medalists at the 1996 Summer Paralympics
Year of birth missing (living people)
Paralympic medalists in athletics (track and field)
New Zealand wheelchair racers